Sami Meguetounif (born 24 May 2004) is a French racing driver who currently competes in the Formula Regional European Championship with MP Motorsport.

Career

Karting 
Born in Marseille and raised in Morocco, Meguetounif started karting in his native France in 2013, racing in the Regional PACAC championship, which he would go on to finish second in. He won the same championship in the Minime class two years later, and soon made his debut in various national championships. Meguetounif moved into international competition in 2017, finishing fifth in the Karting Academy Trophy and getting second place in the Rotax Max Challenge Grand Finals, only losing out to Tijmen van der Helm. That year Meguetounif also won two trophies in his homeland, one of them being the National Championship, beating future flatmate and Formula 4 rival Victor Bernier. In 2018 Meguetounif went on to improve to fourth in the Academy Trophy, and also made his first appearance in the European Karting Championship. He finished his karting career in 2019, with 14th place at the World Championships.

Lower formulae

2019 
Meguetounif made his car racing debut in the 2019 French F4 Championship, competing at the Circuit Paul Ricard, ending up in the top ten in two out of three races. He also made a solitary appearance as a guest driver in the final round of the Formula 4 South East Asia Championship, where he finished second in all but one of his races.

2020 
For 2020 Meguetounif decided to race in the French F4 Championship for a full season. He started the season out with only ten points from the first round, but would go on to improve rapidly, getting his first podium with a second place finish in race 1 at Magny-Cours. After a disappointing round in Zandvoort Meguetounif returned to the rostrum with third place in race 1 of round four. He followed that success up with his most successful round of the season, scoring both pole positions, two seconds and one third place at the Circuit de Spa-Francorchamps. He finished his season off strongly, achieving his only win of the season at Le Castellet, and scoring two further podiums in the final two rounds. In total, Meguetounif finished on the podium eight times and ended up fourth in the standings.

2021 

In 2021 the French driver joined R-ace GP to compete in the ADAC Formula 4 Championship on a full-time basis, whilst also racing in certain rounds of the Italian Championship.

Formula Regional Championship

2021 
On 4 October 2021 it was announced that Meguetounif would start the final four races of the Formula Regional European Championship, remaining with R-ace. He finished his first two races at the Regional F3 level in 22nd and 20th at the Mugello Circuit. The Frenchman improved significantly in the final round, finishing close to the top-ten in both races.

2022 
In February of the following year, Meguetounif took part in the final round of the Formula Regional Asian Championship with Evans GP, in preparation for his main campaign. Having finished 13th in his debut race, Meguetounif scored points in an incident-packed race 2. He ended up 20th in the standings.

Meguetounif joined MP Motorsport for that year's Formula Regional European Championship, partnering Michael Belov and Dilano van 't Hoff. He scored his first points in the first race with a ninth-place finish, missing out on the rookie win to Sebastián Montoya by three tenths. In Race 1 of the second round of the season Meguetounif experienced a hard crash after being pushed off the track. He recounts losing consciousness after colliding with the wall but was found to have no serious issues during subsequent check-ups. He took part in qualifying the day after, but withdrew from the race.

2023 
Meguetounif competed the full season in the 2023 Formula Regional Middle East Championship with MP Motorsport.

MP Motorsport retained Meguetounif for the 2023 Formula Regional season.

Personal life 
Meguetounif is currently studying in his final year of the Lycée, the equivalent to A-Levels in France. He lives and studies together with his F4 teammate Victor Bernier.

Karting record

Karting career summary

Racing record

Racing career summary 

† As Meguetounif was a guest driver, he was ineligible to score points.
* Season still in progress.

Complete French F4 Championship results
(key) (Races in bold indicate pole position) (Races in italics indicate fastest lap)

† As Meguetounif was a guest driver, he was ineligible to score points.

Complete ADAC Formula 4 Championship results 
(key) (Races in bold indicate pole position) (Races in italics indicate fastest lap)

Complete Formula Regional European Championship results 
(key) (Races in bold indicate pole position) (Races in italics indicate fastest lap)

* Season still in progress.† As Meguetounif was a guest driver, he was ineligible to score points.

Complete Formula Regional Asian Championship results 
(key) (Races in bold indicate pole position) (Races in italics indicate the fastest lap of top ten finishers)

Complete Formula Regional Middle East Championship results 
(key) (Races in bold indicate pole position) (Races in italics indicate fastest lap)

* Season still in progress.
  – Driver did not finish the race but was classified, as he completed more than 90% of the race distance.

References

External links 
 

2004 births
Living people
French racing drivers
French sportspeople of Moroccan descent
French F4 Championship drivers
ADAC Formula 4 drivers
Italian F4 Championship drivers
Formula Regional Asian Championship drivers
Formula Regional European Championship drivers
MP Motorsport drivers
Team Meritus drivers
Karting World Championship drivers
R-ace GP drivers
Formula Regional Middle East Championship drivers